Madruga Municipal Museum is a museum located in the 25th avenue in Madruga, Cuba. It was established on 12 February 1982.

Since October 20, 2018, this Municipal Museum is named after María Mercedes García Santana.

The museum holds collections on history, weaponry and decorative arts.

See also 
 List of museums in Cuba

References 

Museums in Cuba
Buildings and structures in Mayabeque Province
Museums established in 1982
1982 establishments in Cuba
20th-century architecture in Cuba